Lac la Ronge 156 is an Indian reserve of the Lac La Ronge Indian Band in Saskatchewan. It is 10 kilometres southwest of Lac la Ronge. In the 2016 Canadian Census, it recorded a population of 2017 living in 441 of its 480 total private dwellings. In the same year, its Community Well-Being index was calculated at 50 of 100, compared to 58.4 for the average First Nations community and 77.5 for the average non-Indigenous community.

References

Indian reserves in Saskatchewan
Division No. 18, Saskatchewan